Taney County is a county located in the southwestern portion of the U.S. state of Missouri. As of the 2020 census, the population was 56,066. Its county seat is Forsyth. It is included in the Branson, Missouri, Micropolitan Statistical Area.

Taney County was officially organized on January 4, 1837, and named in honor of Roger Brooke Taney, the fifth Chief Justice of the U.S. Supreme Court, best known for delivering the infamous majority opinion in Dred Scott v. Sandford. However, unlike Roger B. Taney, who pronounced his name /ˈtɔːni/, the "Taney" in Taney County is generally pronounced /ˈteɪni/.

The county includes the popular tourist destinations Branson, Table Rock, Taneycomo and Bull Shoals Lakes.

History
The first Taney County Courthouse was built on the mouth of Bull Creek at the confluence of the White River by early pioneers in 1837. Its use as a courthouse ended after Forsyth became the county seat; it was destroyed in a tornado in 1963.

The county's second courthouse, in Forsyth, was destroyed in a Civil War battle on July 22, 1861. The rebuilt courthouse was destroyed by fire on December 19, 1885. A third courthouse was removed in 1952 to permit the building of Bull Shoals Lake. The fourth, and present, courthouse was occupied on August 1, 1952. An addition was completed in 1991 after two years of construction.

In 1904, the White River Railway was extended through the rugged terrain of Stone and Taney counties. By then, both counties had for years had a sundown town policy, forbidding African Americans to live there.

In 2008, a New Taney County Judicial Center was built.  That Judicial Center houses the courtrooms, the Circuit Clerk, and the County Jail.

Geography

The county is drained by White River and its affluents.

Adjacent counties
Christian County (north)
Douglas County (northeast)
Ozark County (east)
Marion County, Arkansas (southeast)
Boone County, Arkansas (south)
Carroll County, Arkansas (southwest)
Stone County (west)

Major highways

 U.S. Route 65
 U.S. Route 160
 Route 76
 Route 86
 Route 125
 Route 165
 Route 176
 Route 248
 Route 265
 Route 376
 Route 465 (decommissioned in early 2020, now part of MO-76)

National protected area
Mark Twain National Forest (part)

Demographics

As of the census of 2000, there were 39,703 people, 16,158 households, and 11,052 families residing in the county. The population density was 24/km2 (63/mi2). There were 19,688 housing units at an average density of 12/km2 (31/mi2). The racial makeup of the county was 96.22% White, 0.35% Black or African American, 0.87% Native American, 0.34% Asian, 0.05% Pacific Islander, 0.74% from other races, and 1.42% from two or more races. About 2.42% of the population were Hispanic or Latino of any race. Among the major first ancestries reported in Taney County were 20.8% German, 18.9% American, 12.4% Irish, and 12.3% English.

There were 16,158 households, out of which 27.80% had children under the age of 18 living with them, 56.60% were married couples living together, 8.60% had a female householder with no husband present, and 31.60% were non-families. 25.70% of all households were made up of individuals, and 10.00% had someone living alone who was 65 years of age or older. The average household size was 2.37 and the average family size was 2.83.

In the county, the population was spread out, with 22.40% under the age of 18, 10.20% from 18 to 24, 26.20% from 25 to 44, 25.00% from 45 to 64, and 16.20% who were 65 years of age or older. The median age was 39 years. For every 100 females, there were 94.00 males. For every 100 females age 18 and over, there were 90.40 males.

The median income for a household in the county was $39,771, and the median income for a family was $47,664. Males had a median income of $25,431 versus $19,655 for females. The per capita income for the county was $21,663. About 9.40% of families and 12.40% of the population were below the poverty line, including 17.60% of those under age 18 and 8.80% of those age 65 or over.

Religion
According to the Association of Religion Data Archives County Membership Report (2000), Taney County is a part of the Bible Belt with evangelical Protestantism being the majority religion. The most predominant denominations among residents in Taney County who adhere to a religion are Southern Baptists (32.88%), Roman Catholics (12.36%), and Presbyterians (9.13%).

2020 Census

Public safety
The Taney County Ambulance District (TCAD) is an emergency medical services (EMS) agency providing exclusive ambulance transport for Taney County, Missouri. TCAD was established by public vote in 1971.

The Taney County Sheriff's Office and its jail are in Forsyth, which also has a police department.

Firefighting services are provided by Central Taney County Fire Protection District and Western Taney County Fire Protection District.

Education
Of adults 25 years of age and older in Taney County, 81.4% possess a high school diploma or higher while 14.9% hold a bachelor's degree or higher as their highest educational attainment.

Colleges and universities
 Ozarks Technical Community College, Hollister
 College of the Ozarks, Point Lookout

Public schools
Bradleyville R-I School District - Bradleyville
Bradleyville Elementary School (PK-06)
Bradleyville High School (07-12)
Branson R-IV School District - Branson
Branson Primary School (PK)
Branson Buchanan Elementary (K-04)
Branson Cedar Ridge Elementary (K-04)
Branson Buchanan Intermediate (04-06)
Branson Cedar Ridge Intermediate (04-06)
Branson Jr. High School (07-08)
Branson High School (09-12)
Forsyth R-III School District - Forsyth
Forsyth Elementary School (K-04)
Forsyth Middle School (05-08)
Forsyth High School (09-12)
Hollister R-V School District - Hollister
Hollister Elementary School (PK-04)
Hollister Middle School (05-06)
 Riedgedale Elementary School
Hollister Jr. High School (07-08)
Hollister High School (09-12)
Kirbyville R-VI School District - Kirbyville
Kirbyville Elementary School (K-03)
Kirbyville Middle School (04-08)
Mark Twain R-VIII School District - Rueter
Mark Twain Elementary School (K-08)
Taneyville R-II School District - Taneyville
Taneyville Elementary School (K-08)

Private schools
Trinity Christian Academy - Hollister - (PK-12) - Non-denominational Christian
Riverview Bible Baptist Church School - Forsyth - (05-08) - Baptist
School of the Ozarks - Point Lookout

Alternative and vocational schools
Delmina Woods Youth Facility - Forsyth - (06-12) - Alternative/Other School

Public libraries
Forsyth Public Library  
Taneyhills Community Library

Politics

Local
As of 2020, the Republican Party completely controls politics at the local level in Taney County. Republicans hold every elected position in the county.  However, the Democratic Party previously controlled politics at the local level during the late 19th century and much of the first half of the 20th century.

State

Taney County is divided into three legislative districts in the Missouri House of Representatives, all of which are held by Republicans. 
 
District 138 — Currently represented by Don Phillips (R-Kimberling City) and consists of a small part the southwestern section of the county. 

District 155 — Currently represented by Lyle Rowland (R-Cedar Creek) and consists of the eastern part of the county, including Cedar Creek, Forsyth, Kirbyville, Kissee Mills, Powersite, and Taneyville.

District 156 — Currently represented by Jeffery Justus (R-Branson) and consists of most of the western part of the county, including Branson, Bull Creek, Hollister, Merriam Woods, Ridgedale, Rockaway Beach, and Table Rock. 

All of Taney County is a part of Missouri's 29th District in the Missouri Senate and is currently represented by David Sater (R-Cassville).

Federal

All of Taney County is in Missouri's 7th Congressional District represented by Billy Long (R-Springfield) in the United States House of Representatives.

Political culture

Taney County is a Republican stronghold in presidential elections. George W. Bush carried Taney County in 2000 and 2004 by more than two-to-one margins.  Taney County strongly favored John McCain over Barack Obama in 2008. The last time the Republican Party failed to carry Taney County was in 1860.

Like most rural areas throughout the Bible Belt in Southwest Missouri, voters in Taney County traditionally adhere to socially and culturally conservative principles which tend to strongly influence their Republican leanings. In 2004, Missourians voted on a constitutional amendment to define marriage as the union between a man and a woman. It passed Taney County with 80.04 percent of the vote, and the state in general with 71 percent of support from voters, making Missouri the first state to ban same-sex marriage. In 2006, Missourians voted on a constitutional amendment to fund and legalize embryonic stem cell research in the state—it failed in Taney County with 56.64 percent voting against the measure. The initiative narrowly passed the state with 51 percent of support from voters as Missouri became one of the first states in the nation to approve embryonic stem cell research. Despite Taney County's longstanding tradition of supporting socially conservative platforms, voters in the county have a penchant for advancing populist causes like increasing the minimum wage. In 2006, Missourians voted on a proposition (Proposition B) to increase the minimum wage in the state to $6.50 an hour—it passed Taney County with 77.78 percent of the vote. The proposition strongly passed every single county in Missouri with 78.99 percent voting in favor as the minimum wage was increased to $6.50 an hour in the state. During the same election, voters in five other states also strongly approved increases in the minimum wage.

Missouri presidential preference primary (2008)

In the 2008 presidential primary, voters in Taney County from both political parties supported candidates who finished in second place in the state at large and nationally.

Former Governor Mike Huckabee (R-Arkansas) received more votes, a total of 3,850, than any candidate from either party in Taney County during the 2008 presidential primary.

Communities

Cities

Branson (small portion in Stone County; largest city)
Forsyth (county seat)
Hollister
Merriam Woods
Rockaway Beach

Villages

Bull Creek
Kirbyville
Saddlebrooke (mostly in Christian County)
Taneyville

Census-designated place
Kissee Mills

Unincorporated communities

Bradleyville
Brownbranch
Cedar Creek
Day
Dickens
Eastview
Garber
Hercules
Hilda
McClurg
Mildred
Mincy
Ozark Beach
Point Lookout
Powersite
Protem
Ridgedale
Swan
Table Rock
Walnut Shade

See also
National Register of Historic Places listings in Taney County, Missouri

References

External links

 Taney County government's website
 Digitized 1930 Plat Book of Taney County  from University of Missouri Division of Special Collections, Archives, and Rare Books
 https://web.archive.org/web/20131013222920/http://2010.census.gov/2010census/popmap/

 
Branson, Missouri micropolitan area
1837 establishments in Missouri
Populated places established in 1837
Sundown towns in Missouri